Sara Genevieve James (born December 27, 1976), billed professionally as Gennie James, is an American former child actress. James is a native of Navasota, Texas.

She acted in several television movies and series between 1984 and 1988 and had the main role in 1987's The Secret Garden as young Mary Lennox.

She was nominated for three Young Artist Awards, in 1985 for Places in the Heart, in 1987 for Alex: The Life of a Child and in 1989 for The Secret Garden, and won another in 1987 for Papa Was a Preacher.

Filmography 
 1988: The River Pirates, Rivers Applewhite
 1988: CBS Summer Playhouse (episode My Africa), Sara Marston
 1987: Broadcast News, Young Jane Craig
 1987: The Secret Garden, Young Mary Lennox
 1987: Amazing Stories (episode Without Diana), Diana Willoughby
 1986: The Christmas Gift, Alexandra 'Alex' Billings
 1986: A Smoky Mountain Christmas, Cindy
 1986: Alex: The Life of a Child, Alex Deford
 1986: If Tomorrow Comes (episode 1.1), Amy Brannigan
 1985: Papa Was a Preacher, Alyene
 1985: The Hugga Bunch, Bridget Severson
 1984: Places in the Heart, Possum Spalding

References

External links
 

1976 births
Living people
20th-century American actresses
Actresses from Texas
American child actresses
People from Navasota, Texas
21st-century American women